Saint-Léger-aux-Bois is a commune in the Seine-Maritime department in the Normandy region in northern France.

Geography

Population

Places of interest
 The church of St.Leger, dating from the sixteenth century.
 A sixteenth century donjon, the ‘Tour de Mailly’, a 15m diameter round tower.

See also
Communes of the Seine-Maritime department

References

Communes of Seine-Maritime